Statistics of Lao League in the 2013 season. League started on 16 March 2013.

Clubs 
SHB Champasak(New additional)
Ezra
Friends Development 
Hoang Anh Attapeu(New additional)
Lao Lane Xang FC
Lao Police Club
Eastern Star FC
Yotha FC

Stadium capacities 

* Stadium use for home team maybe unconfirmed

League table

Top scorer

References 

Lao Premier League seasons
1
Laos
Laos